Julie Betu (born 25 August 1995; disappeared on 2 July 2014) is a Congolese handball player, who played for Héritage Kinshasa and the DR Congo national team.

On the night of 2 to 3 July 2014, Betu and two other juniors of Congolese handball team, Mirinelle Kele and Laetitia Mumbala disappeared from their hotel in Đurđevac, Croatia, during the 2014 Women's Junior World Handball Championship. As of 2021, they have not yet been found.

See also
List of people who disappeared

References

1995 births
2010s missing person cases
Democratic Republic of the Congo female handball players
Missing person cases in Europe